Kodacolor Technology is a Kodak-owned brand used to collectively market several of its inkjet printing technologies. It was announced on February 6, 2007 at the launch of Kodak EasyShare All-in-One Printers.

Kodacolor Technology is protected by United States patent 7,655,083.

References

External links
  - Archive of PowerPoint presentation from Kodak's website
  - Archive of original blog from Kodak's website

Kodak
Non-impact printing
Digital photography
Kodak